Spermatid nuclear transition protein 1 is a protein that in humans is encoded by the TNP1 gene.

References

Further reading